Michel Roquebert (7 August 1928 – 15 June 2020) was a French writer and historian.

Biography 
After studying classical studies at the Lycée Montaigne in Bordeaux, Roquebert earned a license in philosophy. He wrote numerous articles on the arts, for which he dedicated a weekly chronicle.

The second volume was written in 1977 and was followed by three more. In 1983, Roquebert retired from journalism and devoted himself to history. He moved to Montségur, where he headed an archaeological research group. In this group, he helped resurface the south facade of the village's castle, restoring it to its original elevation.

Roquebert was elected into the Société archéologique du Midi de la France in 1971. In 2001, he became a corresponding member of the Académie des sciences, inscriptions et belles-lettres de Toulouse. He joined the Consistori del Gay Saber on 16 January 2011. He was a member of the Centre d'études cathares de Carcassonne from 1985 to 2011. He was honorary president of the Association d'études du catharisme from its founding in 2011.

Michel Roquebert died on 15 June 2020 in Toulouse at the age of 91.

Awards 
 Knight of the Ordre national du Mérite
 Knight of the Ordre des Arts et des Lettres

Publications

Books 
  (1966)
  (1970)
  (1977)
  (1981)
  (1986)
  (1986)
  (1988)
  (1989)
  (1992)
  (1994)
  (1998)
  (1998)
  (1999)
  (2001)
  (2001)
  (2003)
  (2005)
  (2018)

Collaborative Works 
  (with Robert Aribaud and Henry Lhong)
  (with Jacques Madaule and Renat Nelli, 1976)
  (with Robèrt Lafont, Jean Duvernoy, Philippe Martel, and Rémy Pech, 1982)
  (with Anne Brenon and Chema Sarmiento, 2001)

Juvenile 
  (1978)
  (1981)

Principal Articles 
 "" (1972)
 "" (1977)
 "" (1978)
 "" (1978)
 "" (1979)
 "" (1980)
 "" (1981)
 "" (1982)
 "" (1985)
 "" (1992)
 "" (1992)
 "" (1994)
 "" (1994)
 "" (1995)
 "" (1995)
 "" (1996)
 "" (1996)
 "" (1996)
 "" (1999)
 "" (2005)
 "" (2005)
 "" (2006)
 "" (2009)
 "" (2013)

References 

1928 births
2020 deaths
French male writers
20th-century French historians
Writers from Bordeaux
Historians of Catharism